Oklahoma Renegades is a 1940 American Western "Three Mesquiteers" B-movie directed by Nate Watt.

Cast 
 Robert Livingston as Stony Brooke
 Raymond Hatton as Rusty Joslin
 Duncan Renaldo as Renaldo
 Lee 'Lasses' White as Jim Keith
 Florine McKinney as Marian Carter
 William Ruhl as Mace Liscomb
 Al Herman as Hank Blake
 James Seay as Carl – Blind veteran
 Eddie Dean as Veteran
 Harold Daniels as Orv Liscomb
 Jack Lescoulie as Veteran
 Frosty Royce as Veteran Mort (as Frosty Royse)

References

External links 

1940 films
1940 Western (genre) films
American Western (genre) films
American black-and-white films
Republic Pictures films
Three Mesquiteers films
Films directed by Nate Watt
1940s English-language films
1940s American films